Toka Gaudi (born 19 May 1972) is a Papua New Guinean cricketer. A left-handed batsman and left-arm fast-medium bowler, he played for the Papua New Guinea national cricket team between 1994 and 2005.

Biography
Born in Port Moresby in 1972, Toka Gaudi made his debut for Papua New Guinea in the 1994 ICC Trophy in Nairobi, his first match coming against Gibraltar. He played in the 1996 ACC Trophy in Malaysia followed by the 1997 ICC Trophy, also in Malaysia.

After playing in the 1998 ACC Trophy in Nepal, he next played for Papua New Guinea in the 2001 Pacifica Cup in Auckland. He played in the 2001 ICC Trophy in Ontario the same year and the Pacifica Cup again in 2002. He played for a combined East Asia Pacific team in the Australian National Country Cricket Championships in 2004 and 2005.

In 2005 he played in the repêchage tournament of the 2005 ICC Trophy. Papua New Guinea won the tournament after beating Fiji in the final. This qualified them for the 2005 ICC Trophy in Ireland in which Gaudi played, making his List A debut. The 11th place play-off match against Uganda was his last match for Papua New Guinea.

References

1972 births
Living people
Papua New Guinean cricketers
People from the National Capital District (Papua New Guinea)